George Chappell Schatz (born April 14, 1949), the Morrison Professor of Chemistry at Northwestern University,  is a theoretical chemist best known for his seminal contributions to the field of reaction dynamics. Born in Watertown, New York, he obtained his B. S. from Clarkson University in 1971 and his Ph.D. from Caltech in 1976 under Aron Kuppermann. Following postdoctoral work at MIT, he joined the Chemistry Department at Northwestern University. Schatz is a member of the Center for Chemistry at the Space-Time Limit.

A longtime senior editor of the Journal of Physical Chemistry, he became its editor-in-chief in 2005. The journal previously (1997) having been split in Journal of Physical Chemistry A (molecular physical chemistry, both theoretical and experimental) and Journal of Physical Chemistry B (solid state, soft matter, liquids), Schatz initiated the spin-off of a third journal, Journal of Physical Chemistry C, focusing on nanotechnology and molecular electronics.

Schatz is a Fellow of the American Physical Society (1987), and member of the National Academy of Sciences, of the International Academy of Quantum Molecular Science, and many other such bodies. He authored over 900 scientific papers, and co-authored two books with his colleague Mark A. Ratner: Introduction to Quantum Mechanics in Chemistry and Quantum Mechanics in Chemistry. Schatz has won the Ahmed Zewail Prize award of the journal Chemical Physics Letters for "outstanding contributions to the theory and understanding of gas-phase reaction dynamics, plasmonics, and nanostructured materials". The biennial Prize was developed by Elsevier to honor Nobel Laureate Ahmed Zewail, who was a longtime editor of Chemical Physics Letters. Schatz is the 7th winner of this international award.

Recently much of Schatz's research has been concerned with nanotechnology and bionanotechnology.

References

External links
 Official home page at Northwestern University
 Editorial profile at the Journal of Physical Chemistry home page
 PNAS Inaugural Profile

1949 births
Living people
Northwestern University faculty
American physical chemists
Theoretical chemists
Members of the International Academy of Quantum Molecular Science
Members of the United States National Academy of Sciences
Fellows of the American Physical Society